Elections to Reading Borough Council took place on 3 May 2012, with 16 council seats up for election. The Labour Party gained Church, Katesgrove, Redlands, Kentwood and Caversham wards, giving them a working majority and control of the council. The Conservative Party lost three seats but gained Peppard ward from an independent. The Liberal Democrats lost two seats but held Tilehurst ward, a seat they had lost the previous year to the Conservative Party. The Green Party gained Park ward from Labour but failed to make gains elsewhere seeing their percentage of the borough-wide vote fall slightly.

After the election, the composition of the council was:

Election result

Ward results

References
Election Candidates Unveiled
Abbey Ward Results 2012
Battle Ward Results 2012
Caversham Ward Results 2012
Church Ward Results 2012
Katesgrove Ward Results 2012
Kentwood Ward Results 2012
Mapledurham Ward Results 2012
Minster Ward Results 2012
Norcot Ward Results 2012
Park Ward Results 2012
Peppard Ward Results 2012
Redlands Ward Results 2012
Southcote Ward Results 2012
Thames Ward Results 2012
Tilehurst Ward Results 2012
Whitley Ward Results 2012

2012 English local elections
2012
2010s in Berkshire